Aleksandr Konstantinovich Omelchenko (born February 11, 1983) is a former Russian professional footballer.

Club career
He made his debut in the Russian Premier League in 2002 for FC Rotor Volgograd.

References

Russian footballers
FC Rotor Volgograd players
FC Tekstilshchik Kamyshin players
FC Olimpia Volgograd players
FC Chernomorets Novorossiysk players
1983 births
Living people
Russian Premier League players
FC Ufa players
People from Volgodonsk
Association football midfielders
FC Yenisey Krasnoyarsk players
FC Avangard Kursk players
Sportspeople from Rostov Oblast